Iron Dawn is the fifth EP by Swedish black metal band Marduk. It was recorded and mixed at Endarker Studio in March 2011 and released that May by Regain Records on CD and limited vinyl.

Track listing

Personnel
Marduk
 Mortuus – vocals
 Morgan Steinmeyer Håkansson – guitar
 Magnus "Devo" Andersson – bass, mixing
 Lars Broddesson – drums

References

2011 EPs
Marduk (band) EPs